Events in the year 1502 in Norway.

Incumbents
Monarch: Hans

Events
Alvsson's rebellion: 
March – Knut Alvsson succeed in occupying Akershus Fortress and Tønsberg Fortress.
July–August – Henrich Krummedige recaptured Tønsberg Fortress and laid siege to Akershus Fortress.
18 August – Knut Alvsson and men loyal to him is murdered during a parley with Henrich Krummedige.
Olsborg Castle was constructed by Nils Ravaldsson.
The Krummedige-Tre Rosor feud ends.

Arts and literature

Births

1 May – Jakob Bagge, admiral (died 1577).

Full date missing 
 Torbjørn Bratt, clergyman (died 1548).

Deaths
18 August - Knut Alvsson, nobleman and landowner (born c. 1455).

References